Audrey Minerva Ferris (born Audrey Minerva Kellar; August 30, 1909 – May 3, 1990) was an American film actress of the silent film era of the late 1920s and into the early 1930s, a singer, and a dancer.

Biography
Born Audrey Minerva Kellar in Detroit, Michigan, Ferris was the only child to Frank M. Kellar, a railway clerk, and Florence Maggie Kellar (née Watson), who were both Canadian immigrants. Ferris was of English, Irish, and German descent. Her parents divorced in 1913. In May 1935, Ferris was a witness in a trial in Los Angeles as her mother sued for more than $3,000 in past-due support payments. Ferris, then 25 years old, testified that she did not remember her father. Her mother remarried in November 1917 to a salesman named David Hamlin Ferris, who adopted Audrey. Ferris and her family moved to Los Angeles in the 1910s, and she attended Los Angeles High School, where she participated in orchestra class as a violinist and was concertmistress.

While living in Los Angeles, she began working to pursue a career as an actress. In 1927 she received her first supporting role in Woman's Law, which starred Lillian Rich. Her work in sound films included portraying a chorus girl in The Jazz Singer (1927), and acting in Rinty of the Desert (1928). She was one of 13 young women named 1927 WAMPAS Baby Stars.

In 1929 she appeared in only three films, but unlike many silent film stars she did make a successful transition to talkies in 1930. However, she never received many lead roles, and starred in only one film that year, and another two in 1932. After having a starring role in the 1933 film Justice Takes a Holiday opposite H.B. Warner and Huntley Gordon, she had only one more film acting role. Her last role was in the 1935 film The Marriage Bargain, alongside Lon Chaney, Jr. and Lila Lee. She retired shortly thereafter.

Ferris was married to Archer Huntington. Ferris died on May 3, 1990, in Los Angeles.

Selected filmography

 1927:   Woman's Law, in Rose La Pierre, produced by Dallas M. Fitzgerald
 1927:   The Silver Slave, in Janet Randall, produced by Howard Bretherton
 1927:   Ginsberg the Great, in Mary, produced by Byron Haskin
 1927:   The Jazz Singer, in a singer, produced by Alan Crosland
 1927:   Sailor Izzy Murphy, in Marie, produced by Henry Lehrman
 1927:   Slightly Used, in Helen Martin, produced by Archie Mayo
 1928:   Women They Talk About, in Audrey Hughes, produced by Lloyd Bacon
 1928:   Powder My Back, in Ruth Stevens, produced by Roy Del Ruth 
 1928:   Rinty of the Desert, in May, produced by D. Ross Lederman 
 1928:   The Little Wildcat, in June, produced by Ray Enright
 1928:   The Lion and the Mouse, (uncredited), produced by Lloyd Bacon
 1928:   Beware of Bachelors, in May, a woman, produced by Roy Del Ruth
 1928:   Beware of Married Men, in Helene Martin, produced by Archie Mayo
 1928:   The Little Wildcat, in Audrey, produced by Ray Enright 
 1929:   Fancy Baggage, in Naomi Iverson, produced by Joseph Santley 
 1929:   The Glad Rag Dog, in Bertha Fairchild, produced by Joseph Santley 
 1929:   Honky Tonk, in Jean Gilmore, produced by Lloyd Bacon
 1930:   Undertow, in Kitty, produced by Snub Pollard
 1932:   Taxi, (uncredited), produced by Roy Del Ruth
 1932:   That Rascal, Not known, produced by Al Christie
 1932:   Honeymoon Beach, in Connie Watts, produced by Harry Edwards
 1933:   Justice Takes a Holiday, in Margaret Walker, produced by Spencer Gordon Bennet
 1935:   The Marriage Bargain, in Mabel Stanhope, produced by Albert Ray

References

External links

Stills with Audrey Ferris at silenthollywood.com

1909 births
1990 deaths
20th-century American actresses
American silent film actresses
American film actresses
Actresses from Detroit
WAMPAS Baby Stars